"Hey Look Ma, I Made It" is a song by Panic! at the Disco from their sixth studio album, Pray for the Wicked, through Fueled by Ramen and DCD2 Records. It was written by band member Brendon Urie with Michael Angelakos, Sam Hollander, Morgan Kibby, and the track's producers Jake Sinclair and Dillon Francis. The song was made available via album release on June 22, 2018, and it was serviced to alternative radio on February 19, 2019, and US contemporary hit radio on February 26, 2019 as the album's third single. The music video was released on June 21, 2018.

"Hey Look Ma, I Made It" and Panic! at the Disco's previous single, "High Hopes", spent a record 65 consecutive weeks at number 1 on Billboards Hot Rock Songs chart, from November 2018 to April 2020.

Music video
The music video was released on June 21, 2018. The video follows a puppet version of lead singer Brendon Urie on his journey to fame, occasionally cutting to the real Urie performing the song. After signing a contract with a manager, Brendon lives the glory of being famous. His manager then introduces him to drugs and he becomes addicted, sending his life into a tailspin to the point that he is robbed and beaten. In a bathroom mirror, puppet Urie encounters the real Brendon, who berates him. Puppet Brendon slowly recovers, dumping his drugs into the toilet and taking walks on the beach. The real Urie finishes the song, whereupon his audience is revealed to be puppets. A puppet version of Jimmy Fallon appears on stage and announces the release of Pray for the Wicked, holding up what appears to be a vinyl of the album, referencing Panic! at the Disco's performance on The Tonight Show Starring Jimmy Fallon in which they performed "Say Amen (Saturday Night)". The manager appears and throws puppet Brendon into a lifeless pile of other puppets.

The clip was named one of the top ten best alternative music videos of 2018 by iHeartRadio.

Reception
Billboard described it as having "a vibrant energy" and "bright melodies". AllMusic described it as "sanguine club jam" and having "a strong hook".

Chart performance
In the United States, "Hey Look Ma, I Made It" peaked at number 16, becoming the band's third top 20 hit on the US Billboard Hot 100 after "I Write Sins Not Tragedies", and "High Hopes", which peaked at numbers 7, and 4 respectively and fourth top 40 hit overall. After a record 34 weeks at number 1 on Billboards Hot Rock Songs chart with "High Hopes", "Hey Look Ma, I Made It" relented the top spot on the July 6, 2019, ranking  reigning for 11 weeks. With the two songs, Panic! went on to lead Hot Rock Songs for a record total of 76 (consecutive) weeks, after "High Hopes" reclaimed the top spot from "Hey Look Ma, I Made It" for another 31 weeks, until the run ended on April 25, 2020, being dethroned by Twenty One Pilots' "Level of Concern".
This distinction was previously held by Imagine Dragons (52 straight weeks, from November 18, 2017, to November 3, 2018) and Twenty One Pilots (44; May 21, 2016 – March 18, 2017). Panic!'s switch at number 1 marked the sixth time that an act had replaced itself atop Hot Rock Songs, which began in 2009. Twenty One Pilots first traded spots with "Ride" replacing "Stressed Out", followed by "Heathens" usurping "Ride". Imagine Dragons then landed three straight leaders over a year-long period, with "Thunder" replaced by "Whatever It Takes"; "Thunder" then returned to number 1 before being succeeded by "Natural".

Charts

Weekly charts

Year-end charts

Decade-end charts

Certifications

References

Songs about mothers
2019 singles
2018 songs
Funk songs
Panic! at the Disco songs
Songs about fame
Songs written by Morgan Kibby
Songs written by Dillon Francis
Songs written by Brendon Urie
Songs written by Michael Angelakos
Songs written by Sam Hollander
Songs written by Jake Sinclair (musician)
Music videos featuring puppetry